Frederick Cleveland Smith (July 29, 1884 – July 16, 1956) was an American physician and politician who served six terms as a Republican member of the U.S. House of Representatives from Ohio from 1939 to 1951.

Early life and career 
Frederick C. Smith was born in Shanesville, Ohio. He graduated in osteopathic medicine at Kirksville, Missouri, and practiced there for several years. He went abroad and continued his study of medicine in Frankfurt, Germany, and in Vienna, Austria.

In 1917 was licensed to practice medicine and surgery in the State of Ohio and commenced practice at Marion, Ohio. He was mayor of Marion, Ohio, from January 1936 until January 1, 1939, when he resigned.

Smith founded the Frederick C. Smith Clinic in Marion, which brought together doctors in various fields in a practice that benefited from each doctor's specialty. The original clinic was located on East Church Street. The concern continues in Marion, Ohio, and still bears the name of Dr. Smith.

Tenure in Congress 
Smith was elected as a Republican to the Seventy-sixth and to the five succeeding Congresses.  He supported $7 billion in aid to Britain, Lend-Lease, and the 1941 amendment to the Neutrality Act to remove restrictions that forbade U.S. vessels from entering combat zones and US citizens from sailing on vessels of belligerents.  He also denounced "isolationism" and took a staunchly "pro-British" position in between the "fall of France" in the summer of 1940 and the Nazi invasion of the Soviet Union in the summer of 1941, during which time Great Britain was essentially alone.  During that time period Smith spoke in favor of aiding Britain as much as possible.  It was said in the early 1950s that while in Congress, Smith "would invariably draw 'zero' ratings from the Americans for Democratic Action and other leftist groups." By one measure, he was the most conservative member of Congress between 1937 and 1970, and the sixth most conservative overall since 1937. He was not a candidate for renomination in 1950.

Death
He resumed his medical profession and died in Marion, Ohio, on July 16, 1956. Interment in Marion Cemetery.

Sources
 
 The Political Graveyard

References

1884 births
1956 deaths
People from Tuscarawas County, Ohio
People from Marion, Ohio
American osteopathic physicians
Mayors of places in Ohio
Old Right (United States)
20th-century American politicians
Republican Party members of the United States House of Representatives from Ohio